Dos tipos de cuidado ("Two Guys To Be Afraid Of") is a 1953 Mexican film. It stars Pedro Infante and Jorge Negrete, with music by Manuel Esperon.

Cast
 Jorge Negrete as Jorge Bueno
 Pedro Infante as Pedro Malo
 Carmelita González as Rosario
 Yolanda Varela as María
 Carlos Orellana as Don Elías
 José Elías Moreno as El General
 Queta Lavat as Genoveva
 Arturo Soto Rangel as Doctor
 Mimí Derba as Josefa, madre de Jorge
 Manuel Noriega as Doctor de Rosario (as Manolo Noriega)

Plot
It is the story of two best friends: Pedro Malo and Jorge Bueno. They dated María (Jorge's sister) and Rosario (Pedro's cousin) together and were happy couples. One year has passed and the couples are no longer together. Jorge took his car to a service station when an old friend told him that Pedro had returned to the village. They are no longer friends—in fact, they are enemies because Pedro, a short time ago, married Jorge's girlfriend and Pedro's own cousin, Rosario.

External links
 

1953 films
1950s Spanish-language films
Mexican musical films
1953 musical films
Mexican black-and-white films
Films directed by Ismael Rodríguez
1950s Mexican films